Buse Kayacan (born July 15, 1992) is a Turkish volleyball player, a member of the club Nilüfer Belediyespor.

Sporting achievements

Clubs 
Turkish Super Cup:
  2011, 2012
Turkish Cup:
  2012
Turkish Championship:
  2012
  2013
  2014

National Team 
European League:
  2015

References

External links
 
 Buse Kayacan at the International Volleyball Federation
 

1992 births
Living people
Turkish women's volleyball players
Galatasaray S.K. (women's volleyball) players
20th-century Turkish sportswomen
21st-century Turkish sportswomen